Georg Krücken (born September 21, 1962 in Bad Honnef, Germany) is a German sociologist and higher education researcher. He is director of the International Center for Higher Education Research Kassel (INCHER-Kassel) at the University of Kassel.

Early life

From 1981 to 1989, Georg Krücken studied sociology, philosophy and political science at the Universities of Bielefeld (Germany) and Bologna (Italy). With a scholarship from the Studienstiftung des deutschen Volkes he earned his PhD in 1996 at the Faculty of Sociology in Bielefeld. His dissertation focused on "Risk Transformation".

Career 
Krücken habilitated in January 2004 at the University of Bielefeld. From 1999 to 2001 he was visiting scholar at the Department of Sociology at Stanford University and in 2005 was visiting professor at the Center de Sociologie des Organisations. He returned to Stanford as a visiting scholar at the School of Education in the summer semester of 2011 and in 2016 completed a research semester as a visiting scholar at the Sciences Po, Center de Sociologie des Organisations in Paris. He is a regular guest lecturer at the University of Vienna.

Between 2006 and 2011, Krücken held the first Chair of Science Organization, Higher Education and Science Management at the German University of Administrative Sciences Speyer, before joining the University of Kassel.

In 2014 he became chairman of the Germany Society for Higher Education Research. In 2016 he was elected a member of the Academia Europaea.

Research 
In his research Krücken focuses on higher education research and the sociology of science. His special interests lie on the combination of neo-institutionalism in organizational research with a macro-sociological view of the world. As both approaches are particularly based on American theory and research, Krücken adds European strands of social theory. His dissertation on the works of John W. Meyer also contributed to the spread of neo-institutionalist approaches in Germany.

In addition to many publications, his scientific work led to the European research network "New Institutionalism" in 2004, of which he is a co-founder and spokesman. It organizes annual scientific conferences in various European countries.

Recent books 
Higher Education in Germany—Recent Developments in an International Perspective. Cham: Springer International Publishing AG, 2018 (together with mit Otto Hüther). Gerhard Casper, President Emeritus and Professor Emeritus, Stanford University, comments on this book: "The foreign observer of German higher education, even the informed foreign observer, struggles to find denominators, not to mention common denominators of a bewildering array of approaches. Otto Hüther and Georg Krücken, in this book, do an absolutely splendid job of offering theoretical perspectives, qualitative and quantitative data, and comparative assessments."

New Themes in Institutional Analysis. Topics and Issues from European Research (edited together with Carmelo Mazza, Renate Meyer und Peter Walgenbach). Cheltenham: Edward Elgar, 2017, .

References

1962 births
Living people
German sociologists
Academic staff of the University of Kassel